Shipley Terrace, formerly known as Randle Heights, is a large residential neighborhood in Southeast Washington, D.C., bordering Prince George's County, Maryland. The neighborhood, named after a former public housing complex in the neighborhood, which was largely occupied by low-income housing – primarily walkup and garden unit apartments. This neighborhood now has a mix of townhome communities, large single-family-home communities, as well as some low-income housing. It is a model neighborhood for the Hope VI revitalization Grant Program.

Shipley Terrace is bounded by Alabama Avenue to the north, Mississippi Avenue to the south, Wheeler Road to the west, Suitland Parkway to the northeast, and Southern Avenue to the southeast. Also see article on Anacostia.

Neighborhoods in Southeast (Washington, D.C.)